B70 or B-70 may refer to:

 B70 (chess opening)
 B70 (New York City bus)
 B-70 Valkyrie, a planned American supersonic bomber aircraft
 Bundesstraße 70, a federal highway in Germany
 CD86, a human protein also called B70
 HLA-B70, an HLA-B serotype
 West Bromwich, UK postcode
 The pennant number assigned to Turkish battlecruiser TCG Yavuz Sultan Selim